Anoushirvan (Shir) Khan Qajar Qovanlou 'Eyn ol-Molk' 'Etezad od-Doleh' (died 1866) was an Iranian aristocrat, general and courtier.

Anoushirvan Khan Qajar Qovanlou, in short Shir Khan, was the only child of Soleyman Khan Qajar Qovanlou 'Khan-e Khanan' with Princess Malekzadeh Khanoum Qajar. Both parents were grandchildren of the Persian king Fath-Ali Shah Qajar. He therefore grew up in one of the most powerful and influential aristocratic families in Iran of the era. Since childhood he belonged to the small group of intimate friends and relatives of his cousin Naser al-Din Shah Qajar.  In 1854 he received the title Eyn ol-Molk and two years later he became Khan Salar, Master of the Royal Kitchens, one of the most important and responsible jobs at court as it entailed preventing any possible attempt at poisoning the monarch. Around 1860 he married his cousin Princess Ezzat od-Doleh, sister of Naser al-Din Shah Qajar, after she divorced her second husband Mirza Kazem Khan 'Nezam ol-Molk'. In 1861 he was chosen as ilkhan (chief) of the Qajars (tribe) and in 1863 he was appointed Governor of Mazandaran, Gorgan and Astarabad and sometime later also of Qazvin, Khuzestan, Mahallat, Shahroud and Bastam. From 1865 he was commander-in-chief of the armies of Mazandaran, Gorgan and Gilan. The actual work in the provinces was done by his half brother Mohammad Ali Khan, as his responsibilities as Khan Salar made it necessary to remain in the proximity of the Shah. In 1864 he was presented with the title Etezad od-Doleh; a title once carried by his great grandfather. In 1866 the Shah gave him the rank of commander-in-chief of  Artillery, but the same year he died of the Plague.

He had issue with Ezzat od-Doleh and with other wives (among them Ghodrat Malek Khanoum). The descendants in the male line later took the family name Sepahbody (Sepahbodi) as a reference to Shir Khan's military rank. Two of his daughters married to Seyyed Sadr ed-Din 'Sadr ol-Ashraf I' from Mahallat, the uncle of Mohsen Sadr. Through one of his sons Shir Khan is the great grandfather of Farhad Sepahbody and through one of this daughters Shir Khan is the great great grandfather of Hossein Eslambolchi.

References 

Year of birth missing
1866 deaths
Place of birth missing
Place of death missing
19th-century Iranian politicians
Qajar courtiers
Qajar governors of Gilan
Commanders in chief